Dual specificity protein phosphatase 12 is an enzyme that in humans is encoded by the DUSP12 gene.

The protein encoded by this gene is a member of the dual specificity protein phosphatase subfamily. These phosphatases inactivate their target kinases by dephosphorylating both the phosphoserine/threonine and phosphotyrosine residues. They negatively regulate members of the mitogen-activated protein (MAP) kinase superfamily (MAPK/ERK, SAPK/JNK, p38), which is associated with cellular proliferation and differentiation. 

Different members of the family of dual specificity phosphatases show distinct substrate specificities for various MAP kinases, different tissue distribution and subcellular localization, and different modes of inducibility of their expression by extracellular stimuli. 

This gene product is the human ortholog of the Saccharomyces cerevisiae YVH1 protein tyrosine phosphatase. It is localized predominantly in the nucleus, and is novel in that it contains, and is regulated by a zinc finger domain.

References

Further reading

External links 
 

EC 3.1.3